The Cameroon national under-17 football team represents Cameroon in football at this age level and is controlled by the Fédération Camerounaise de Football. The team competes in the UNIFFAC Cup, Africa U-17 Cup of Nations and FIFA U-17 World Cup, both held every two years.

Competitive record

FIFA U-17 World Cup record

Africa U-17 Cup of Nations record

CAF U-16 and U-17 World Cup Qualifiers record 

Denotes draws include knockout matches decided on penalty kicks.#

Current squad
 The following players were called up for the 2023 Africa U-17 Cup of Nations qualification matches.
 Match dates: 12, 15, 18 and 21 January 2023

References

African national under-17 association football teams
under-17